The women's shot put at the 1978 European Athletics Championships was held in Prague, then Czechoslovakia, at Stadion Evžena Rošického on 30 August 1978.

Medalists

Results

Final
30 August

†Elena Stoyanova ranked initially 5th (19.43m), but was disqualified for infringement of IAAF doping rules.

Participation
According to an unofficial count, 12 athletes from 6 countries participated in the event.

 (2)
 (2)
 (2)
 (1)
 (3)
 (2)

References

Shot put
Shot put at the European Athletics Championships
1978 in women's athletics